Robert Champion may refer to:

Bob Champion, Jockey
Robert Champion, Drum Major who died in hazing incident